Charles Cooper may refer to:

 Charles D. Cooper (1769–1831), New York Secretary of State, 1817–1818
 Charles Purton Cooper (1793–1873), English lawyer and antiquary
 Charles Cooper (judge) (1795–1887), first Chief Justice of South Australia, 1856–1861
 Charles Henry Cooper (1808–1866), English antiquarian
 Charles Alfred Cooper (1829–1916), British newspaper editor and author
 Charles F. Cooper (politician) (1852–1919), English-born Free Baptist clergyman and political figure in Nova Scotia, Canada
 Charles Merian Cooper (1856–1923), U.S. Representative from Florida
 Charles H. Cooper (1865–1946), Justice of the Montana Supreme Court
 Charles Cooper (cricketer) (1868–1943), English cricketer
 Charles Henry St. John Cooper (1869–1926), English author
 Charles Cooper (motor manufacturer) (1893–1964), co-founder of the Cooper Car Company
 Tarzan Cooper (1907–1980), basketball player for New York Renaissance
 Charles F. Cooper (ecologist) (1924–1994), American ecologist
 Chuck Cooper (basketball) (1926–1984), basketball player for the Boston Celtics
 Charles Cooper (actor) (1926–2013), television and movie actor
 Charles J. Cooper (born 1952), American appellate attorney and litigator in Washington, D.C.
 Charlie Cooper (actor) (born 1989), British actor
 Charlie Cooper (footballer) (born 1997), English professional footballer

See also
 Chuck Cooper (disambiguation)